Pauline Rose Ann Campbell-Sukhai is a Guyanese politician. She is the current Minister of Amerindian Affairs in Guyana. She was appointed Minister on August 5, 2020, by President Irfaan Ali.  She had previously served in that position from January 4, 2008 to May 15, 2015.

References 

Living people
Members of the National Assembly (Guyana)
Year of birth missing (living people)
Government ministers of Guyana
Women government ministers of Guyana